Wallace Wade Moon (April 3, 1930 – February 9, 2018) was an American professional baseball outfielder in Major League Baseball. Moon played his 12-year career in the major leagues for the St. Louis Cardinals (1954–1958) and Los Angeles Dodgers (1959–1965). He batted left-handed and threw right-handed.

Moon was the 1954 National League Rookie of the Year. He was an All-Star for two seasons and a Gold Glove winner one season. Moon batted .295 or more for seven seasons. He led the National League in triples in 1959 and in fielding percentage as a left fielder in 1960 and 1961.

Moon was a three-time World Series champion with the Los Angeles Dodgers in 1959, 1963, and 1965.

Youth

Moon was named after Wallace Wade, a former college football coach at the University of Alabama and Duke University. From a family of educators, he earned a master's degree in administrative education from Texas A&M University in College Station while he was still in the minor leagues.  He coached from 1953 to 1954 at Lake City, also in Craighead County, Arkansas.

Major league career

In the spring of 1954, the Cardinals told Moon to report to their minor league spring training camp. He ignored the order and reported instead to St. Petersburg with the Cardinals. He said that he would make the team or quit baseball. They let him stay, and by the end of the spring training he replaced Enos Slaughter in the outfield. To make room for him on the roster, St. Louis sent Slaughter to the New York Yankees.

Moon made his major league debut on April 13, 1954. In his first at-bat, despite chants of "We want Slaughter", he belted a home run against the Chicago Cubs; in the same game Tom Alston became the first African American to play for the Cardinals. Moon finished his rookie season with a .304 batting average, 12 home runs, 76 runs batted in, and career-high numbers in runs (106), hits (193), doubles (29), and  stolen bases (18) in 151 games. He earned both the MLB Rookie of the Year and The Sporting News Rookie of the Year honors. Almost a unanimous vote, Moon won easily over Ernie Banks, Gene Conley and Hank Aaron.

A fine left fielder with a good arm, Moon also played right field and center as well as first base. He hit a career-high 24 homers in 1957, and made the All-Star team in 1957 and 1959 (two games were played). Twice in his career, Moon compiled double figures in doubles, triples, home runs and stolen bases: 22, 11, 16, 12 in 1956, and 26, 11, 19, 15 in 1959, his first year with the Dodgers.

After the 1958 season, the Cardinals traded Moon to the Dodgers for outfielder Gino Cimoli. Both players were coming off years when they batted below .250; the Cardinals also sent pitcher Phil Paine, who never played for the Dodgers. After consulting with friend and mentor Stan Musial, Moon adjusted his batting stance to emphasize hitting to left. The results were very successful. In his first season with the Dodgers, the team won the World Championship. Moon provided support in the lineup for Duke Snider, Gil Hodges and Don Demeter. He gained quick public acclaim in 1959 for the "Moon shots" that he hit over the high left field screen. Moon hit a home run in the sixth and final game of that World Series, which the Dodgers won over the Chicago White Sox. He also caught Luis Aparicio's fly ball for the final out of the Series.

Moon was a Gold Glove Award winner for left field in 1960 leading National League left fielders in assists, double plays, and fielding percentage. He had another good season in 1961, batting .328 with 17 home runs and 88 runs batted in while leading National League left fielders in fielding percentage.

A career .289 hitter, Moon hit 142 home runs with 661 runs batted in during 1457 games, with a .371 on-base percentage and a .445 slugging average for a combined .816 on-base plus slugging percentage. His career fielding percentage at all three outfield positions and first base was .980.  He also scored the last run ever in the Coliseum. He retired as a player after the 1965 season.

Post-playing career

In 1969, Moon was a batting coach for the San Diego Padres, joining manager Preston Gómez and pitching coach and former teammate Roger Craig.

Moon went on to become athletic director and baseball coach at John Brown University, and a coach and minor league manager and owner of the San Antonio Dodgers for four years beginning in the late 1970s. 

Moon managed the minor-league Frederick Keys, a Carolina League affiliate of the Baltimore Orioles, in 1990 and 1991.

Moon moved to Bryan, Texas, where he lived for over 25 years. He retired in 1998. He was married to Bettye and had five children and seven grandchildren.

Moon is featured on many websites featuring baseball cards, as he sported a prominent unibrow.

The January 27, 1960, episode ("The Larry Hanify Story") of the popular TV western Wagon Train featured Moon in a brief role. The end credits included: "And Introducing Wally Moon as Sheriff Bender." There was no baseball tie-in with his character, but the sheriff was hit by a bullet during a shoot-out with Tommy Sands' bad guy.

Moon died on February 9, 2018, at the age of 87.

See also
 Home run in first Major League at-bat
 List of Gold Glove Award winners at outfield
 MLB Rookie of the Year Award
 Sporting News Rookie of the Year Award
 List of Major League Baseball annual triples leaders

References

External links

Wally Moon at SABR (Baseball BioProject)

1930 births
2018 deaths
American men's basketball players
Baseball players from Arkansas
Gold Glove Award winners
Houston Buffaloes players
John Brown Golden Eagles athletic directors
John Brown Golden Eagles baseball coaches
John Brown University faculty
Lácteos de Pastora players
Los Angeles Dodgers players
Major League Baseball outfielders
Major League Baseball Rookie of the Year Award winners
Minor league baseball managers
National League All-Stars
Omaha Cardinals players
People from Craighead County, Arkansas
Rochester Red Wings players
St. Louis Cardinals players
San Diego Padres coaches
Texas A&M Aggies baseball players
Texas A&M Aggies men's basketball players